The Sale of Horses Act 1555 (2 & 3 Phil & Mary c 7) was an Act of the Parliament of England.

The whole Act was repealed by section 10(2) of, and Part I of Schedule 3 to, the Criminal Law Act 1967.

As to common informer actions under this Act, see section 1 of, and the Schedule to, the Common Informers Act 1951.

See also
The Sale of Horses Act 1588

References
Halsbury's Statutes,

Acts of the Parliament of England (1485–1603)
1555 in law
1555 in England
Horses in the United Kingdom